Dwight D. York (born June 26, 1945), also known as Malachi Z. York, Issa al-Haadi al-Mahdi, et alii, is an American criminal, black supremacist, pedophile, child molester, musician, and writer best known as the founding leader of several black Muslim groups in New York, most notably the Nuwaubian Nation, a black supremacist, new religious movement that has existed in some form since the 1960s. He is a convicted child molester.

York began founding several black Muslim groups in the late 1960s. In 1967 he was preaching to the "Ansaaru Allah" (viz. African-Americans) in Brooklyn, New York, during the period of the black power movement. He founded numerous religious movements under various names between the 1960s and 1980s. These were at first based on pseudo-Islamic themes and Judaism (Nubian Islamic Hebrews). Later he developed a theme derived from "Ancient Egypt", mixing ideas taken from black nationalism, cryptozoology, Christianity, UFO religions, New Age, and popular conspiracy theories. He last called his group the United Nuwaubian Nation of Moors, Nuwaubian Nation, or Nuwabians.

Around 1990, York and the Nuwaubian Nation relocated to rural Putnam County, Georgia, where they built a large complex. They came under scrutiny in the early 1990s, after they built Tama-Re, an Egyptian-themed "city" for about a hundred of his followers in Putnam County. Before York's trial, the community had been joined directly and in the area by hundreds of other followers from out of state, while alienating both Black and White local residents. The community was intensively investigated after numerous reports that York had molested numerous children of his followers. He and his group were originally based in Brooklyn, New York and some of them relocated to Athens, Georgia after his arrest. York was convicted in 2004 of child molestation and violations of the Racketeer Influenced and Corrupt Organizations Act. He is serving a 135-year sentence.

York and his wife, Kathy Johnson, were arrested in May 2002. In 2004, he was convicted on federal charges of transporting minors across state lines for the purposes of child sexual molestation, as well as racketeering and financial reporting violations. York's case was reported as the largest prosecution for child molestation ever directed at a single person in the history of the United States, both in terms of number of victims and number of incidents.

Biography

Early life

According to a birth certificate issued in the United States, Dwight D. York was born in Boston, Massachusetts. Other sources give his birthplace as New Jersey, New York, Baltimore, or Takoradi, Ghana.

York says that he was raised in Massachusetts, and at the age of seven went to Aswan, Egypt, to learn about Islam. "My grandfather, As Sayyid Abdur Rahman Al Mahdi, the Imaam of the Ansaars in the Sudan until 1959 AD, upon looking into my eyes foretold that I was the one who would possess 'the light.'" He says he returned to the United States in 1957 at age 12 and continued to study Islam. As an adolescent, he moved with his family to Teaneck, New Jersey.

In the late 1960s York, calling himself "Imaam Isa", combined elements of the Moorish Science Temple of America, the Nation of Islam, the Nation of Gods and Earths and Freemasonry, and founded a quasi-Muslim black nationalist movement and community. He called it "Ansaar Pure Sufi", or the "Ansaaru Allah Community", c. 1970. He instructed members to wear black and green dashikis.

He later changed his name to "Imaam Isa Abdullah" and renamed his "Ansaar Pure Sufi" ministry to the "Nubians" in Brooklyn in 1967. The group was considered to be part of the Black Hebrews phenomenon, under the name "Nubian Islaamic Hebrews" and "Nubian Hebrew Mission" as of 1969. Unlike other groups, they were not Judeo-Christian but Judeo-Islamic.  This was also the period of Black Power among some African Americans.

Ansaaru Allah Community (1970)
York later traveled to Africa, to Sudan and Egypt in particular. He met and persuaded members of Mohamed Ahmed Al-Mahdi's family to finance him to set up a cell of their organization in the United States. This was to be a "west" or "American" political wing of Sudan's Ansar movement under Sadiq al-Mahdi (also see Umma Party). He began to develop the claim of his "Sudanese" roots  in order to authenticate his American branch of the sect.

After York returned from a pilgrimage to (Egypt and Sudan), he invited Sadiq Al-Mahdi to the US. In 1970 his group changed its name to the "Ansaaru Allah Community in the West". A 1993 FBI report described this group as a "front for a wide range of criminal activity, including arson, welfare fraud and extortion."

The group wrote:

The women of the Ansaaru Allah Community focus on memorizing history as their Imam sees it, learning Arabic (many of them are quite fluent), incorporating Sudanese etiquette into their mannerisms and memorizing the Qur'an. They participate in the compilation of the various texts produced by the community and also work in the recording studio owned by the community. Other than this work, the women's main source of income comes from US government public assistance and monies earned by the men in various enterprises such as food shops, jewelry and merchandise stores, and street vending.

Brooklyn (1980–1993)
The New York Press reported on York:

He was based in Coney Island for a time, and operated a bookstore and a printing press on Flatbush Ave. in the 70s. In the 80s he was based in Brooklyn, on Bushwick Ave. York's students are best remembered by New Yorkers as practitioners of orthodox Islam – members of certain New York Five-Percent Nation, Nation of Islam and Arab Islamic mosques still regard the Nuwaubians as a rival faction – but at different times they followed the paths of Christianity and Judaism. Operations relocated to Liberty, near the Catskills, around 1991, then to Georgia in 1993.

The community in Brooklyn, reported as identifying as the "Holy Tabernacle of the Most High" and also as the "Children of Abraham", was said to be led by Rabboni Y'shua Bar El Haady. They practiced a mixture of Judaism and Islam. They were reported as numbering about 300 persons and in 1994 the group reportedly still owned nine apartment buildings, of which five were in tax arrears. Local politicians were concerned that the abandoned buildings would become centers of uses that would damage the neighborhood. Anecdotal reports were that some of the group went to Monroe County, New York, and others to Georgia.

Musical productions 
In the early 1980s, York performed as vocalist with his own groups, known as Jackie and the Starlights, the Students, and Passion.

He launched his own record label, named Passion Productions, recording as the solo artist "Dr. York". His debut release was the single "Only a Dream" (later included in the album New York, Hot Melt Records UK, 1985). "Dr. York" and Passion Productions were advertised in the May 4, 1985, issue of Billboard magazine.

Later York formed York Records releasing the music of several successful artists within the genre of R&B, Hip Hop, Gospel, and others.  York Records released York's single called “It’s Too Late” in 1986 featuring Sarah Dash of Patti Labelle's Labelle. In 1988 York Records released “He’s Coming” by Gospel legends Doc Mckenzie and the Hi-Lites. Also in 1988 he released Kenne & Petite's “What Is He To You?”. Petite went onto become the early 90s group Ex-Girlfriend featuring Stacy Francis from X-Factor and TV One's R&B Divas Los Angeles. Then Nubian Egyptian/Sudanese vocalist and oud player Hamza El Din “Live At The Ansaaru Allah Community In America” also in 1998.

He also released Passion on his York Records and Passion Records imprint. A group that consisted of York, Zeemo (Abdul Aziz), and Steve (Segovia) and later even featured Wendell Sawyer, Vernon Sawyer, and  Ted Mills of the group Blue Magic. York said he performed popular music in order to "reach a mass majority of my people through my music."

His Passion Studios recorded artists like Force MD's, Fredro Starr of Onyx, and Stetsasonic.

Ministry and fraternal orders
York's groups had a variety of names and functions: quasi-religious, fraternal, and tribal. They were called "Holy Tabernacle Ministries", " Church of Karast," "Holy Seed Baptist Synagogue", "Ancient Mystic Order of Melchizedek", "Ancient  Order", "All Eyez on Egypt", "United Nuwaubian Nation of Moors", "Yamassee Native American Tribe", "Washitaw Tribe", and "Lodge 19 of the Ancient and Mystic Order of Malachizodok." While drawing from various religious and historical themes, Malachi York continued to focus on Nubia. He promoted a design featuring an ankh in the middle of a six-pointed star of Judaism and Islamic crescent, a symbol used by the Ansarullah Community. The ankh is associated with pre-Islamic Sudan, Nubia.

Dwight York changed his name legally in 1990 to "Issa al Haadi al Mahdi" when he was still living in Brooklyn. He changed it again in 1993 to "Malachi York", but also adopted a number of titles and pseudonyms, including "The Supreme Grand Master Dr. Malachi Z. York," "Nayya Malachizodoq-El", and "Chief Black Eagle".

By 1985 York had added miracle-performance to his repertoire. He claimed to materialize sacred, healing ash in front of his followers, much in the fashion of Sathya Sai Baba.

In 1988 York was convicted of obtaining a passport with a false birth certificate.

Move to Georgia and construction of Tama-Re (1993–2002)

York left Brooklyn with an estimated 300 followers about 1990. Some settled in upstate New York. He later moved with numerous followers to Georgia. Others joined them from such cities as Baltimore, Philadelphia, Hartford, New York and Washington, D.C. According to former follower Robert J. Rohan, who later wrote a book about the movement, York moved in order to avoid criminal investigations and other charges in New York.

Perhaps to avoid scrutiny from the international Muslim community, the Nation of Islam, the Nation of Gods and Earths, legal troubles, and the negative history of his group during their New York period, he changed his own name several times, as well as the group's name, and masked different parts of their doctrine. In Georgia, they changed their name to the "United Nuwaubian Nation of Moors".

It was built over a period of years and completed in 1993.

Tensions with county authorities increased in 1998, when the county sought an injunction against construction and uses that violated zoning. At the same time, the Nuwaubian community increased its leafletting of Eatonton and surrounding areas, charging white officials with racial discrimination and striving to increase opposition to them. Threats mounted and an eviscerated dog carcass was left at the home of the county attorney.

Within Putnam County, the Nuwaubians lost black support, in part by trying to take over the NAACP chapter. But outside, they appealed to activists, claiming to be persecuted in the county. During this period, the group maintained Holy Tabernacle stores "in more than a dozen cities in the U.S., the United Kingdom and Trinidad."  And York purchased a $557,000 mansion in Athens, Georgia, about 60 miles away, the base of the University of Georgia.

In July 1999, Time magazine reported on the "40-ft. pyramids, obelisks, gods, goddesses and a giant sphinx," built by York's followers in rural Georgia in an article titled "Space Invaders".

In 2005 federal government officials acquired the property of Tama-Re through asset forfeiture after York was convicted and sentenced to prison for 135 years. He owed money for violating financial laws. After the property was sold, new owners demolished the buildings and monuments.

Arrest and conviction of child molestation (2002–present)
Beginning in Brooklyn, York had established strict sexual practices within the community, reserving for himself sexual access to many women and girls, including wives and children of followers.

Theodore Gabriel wrote about these practices:

[W]hile extolling the virtues and importance of family life and the conjugal relationship, he [York] denies such relationships to his followers except at strictly controlled intervals. He urges his female followers to pattern themselves on the Islamic paradigms of the wife and the mother, apparently desiring the creation of stable family units. But in reality the husbands and wives are segregated in dormitories, separated also from their children. York permits spouses to cohabit only once every three months. They are permitted to meet in the "Green Room" by prior appointment only.

Anonymous letters were sent to Putnam County officials alleging child molestation at the Nuwaubian community. The FBI, which had started investigating the group in 1993, assigned a major task force to it. In 2002 York was arrested and charged with more than 100 counts of sexually molesting dozens of children, some as young as four years old. According to Bill Osinski, who wrote a 2007 book about York and the case:

When he [York] was finally indicted, state prosecutors literally had to cut back the number of counts listed — from well beyond a thousand to slightly more than 200 — because they feared a jury simply wouldn't believe the magnitude of York's evil.… [It] is believed to be the nation's largest child molestation prosecution ever directed at a single person, in terms of number of victims and number of alleged criminal acts.

In early 2003 York's lawyer had him evaluated by a forensic psychologist, who diagnosed a DSM-IV impression consisting of Axis I – Clinical Syndrome of Delusional (Paranoid) Disorder, Generalized anxiety disorder, Adjustment disorder with depressed mood, and Axis II – personality disorders; histrionic personality traits, self-defeating personality traits, and schizotypal personality features.

In 2003, York entered into a plea bargain that was later dismissed by the judge. He was convicted by a jury on January 23, 2004. The judge rejected his plea to be returned for trial to his own "tribe", after York claimed status as an indigenous person:

Your Honor, with all due respects to your government, your nation, and your court, we the indigenous people of this land have our own rights, accepted sovereign, our own governments. We are a sovereign people, Yamassee, Native American Creeks, Seminole, Washitaw Mound Builders. And all I'm asking is that the Court recognize that I am an indigenous person. Your court does not have jurisdiction over me. I should be transferred to the Moors Cherokee Council Court in which I will get a trial by juries of my peers. I cannot get a fair trial, Your Honor, if I'm being tried by the settlers or the confederates. I have to be tried by Native Americans as a Native American. That's my inalienable rights, and it's on record.

He asserted to the court that he was a "secured party", and answered questions in court with the response: "I accept that for value." This may have been a heterodox legal strategy based on patriot mythology.

Early in 2004, York was convicted in federal court by a jury of multiple RICO, child molestation, and financial reporting charges. He was sentenced to 135 years in prison.

His case was appealed to the 11th Circuit Court of Appeals, which upheld the convictions on October 27, 2005. A U.S. Supreme Court appeal was denied in June 2006.

York's followers assert a number of defenses, including that their leader Malachi Z. York, who was charged and convicted, is not the same person as the Dwight D. York who is listed in court documents as the defendant. (One of York's sons is named Dwight, and sometimes the claim is made that it is York's son and not York who is or should be the real defendant.) Others say that York was "set up" by his son Jacob in coordination with al Qaeda-linked American mosques jealous of York's influence among black Muslims.

York believes that his betrayal, arrest, trial and imprisonment (and eventual release) were foretold in chapter 10 of Zecharia Sitchin's The Wars of the Gods and the Men, with York being represented by Mar-duq in that story.

Imprisonment

, Dwight York is serving his sentence at the United States Penitentiary Administrative Maximum Facility (ADX) in Florence, Colorado, as Inmate # 17911–054. His projected release date is July 12, 2120.

York's followers have said that since 1999 York has been a Consul General of Monrovia, Liberia, under appointment from then-President Charles Taylor. They argue he should be given diplomatic immunity from prosecution and extradited as a persona non-grata to Liberia. Officials have not accepted this claim.

Teachings 

York has taught an ever-changing and multifaceted doctrine over the years, with influences and borrowings from many sources. It has included a baroque cosmology, unconventional theories about race and human origins, cryptozoological and extraterrestrial speculations, black nationalism, conspiracy theory, and religious practices invented or borrowed from many existing religions.

Claim of extraterrestrial origin 

York has claimed to be an extraterrestrial master teacher from the planet Rizq. He wrote, "We have been coming to this planet before it had your life form on it. ... My incarnation as an Ilah Mutajassid or Avatara was originally in the year 1945 A.D. In order to get here I travelled by one of the smaller passenger crafts called SHAM out of a Motherplane called MERKABAH or NIBIRU." This version of York came to Earth on March 16, 1970. (Comet Bennett, which was visible on that date, is said to have really been York's spacecraft.) York taught that the Motherplane/NIBIRU would launch the Crystal City or New Jerusalem (see: Book of Revelation 21:2) to our solar system from its position in Orion. A 40-year process of taking the 144,000 Chosen Few (see: Book of Revelation 14:1) — 12,000 each from the Twelve Tribes of Israel — into the Planet Craft NIBIRU began on August 12, 2003, and will end on August 12, 2043. These Chosen Few will be groomed for 1,000 years and returned to Earth for the final battle against the Luciferians and also to redeem man from the 6,000-year rulership of the Devil and his seed.

Descent
York has had a variety of stories about his ancestry and birth, including that he was born in Omdurman, Sudan. This has not been documented. His parents of record are Mary C. York (née Williams), now also known as Faatimah Maryam, and her husband David Piper York. York has claimed that his biological father was Al Haadi Abdur Rahman Al Mahdi, whom his mother ostensibly met while studying as a student in the Sudan. This is not supported by any documentary sources.

York claims that the name he was given at birth was "Isa Al Haadi Al Mahdi" and that he was not given the name "York" (without a first name) until a month later when he and his mother returned to Boston. David and Mary York had four other children together: David, Dale, Debra and Dennis. York has claimed, without documentation being found, that his father was descended from "Ben" York, an enslaved African American who took part in the Lewis and Clark Expedition (1804-1806).

He claims a paternal Sudanese grandfather, As Sayyid Abdur Rahman Al Mahdi, making York a descendant of the Muslim leader Muhammad Ahmad. 
On his mother's side, York described his maternal grandfather, Clarence Daniel "Bobby" Williams, as "an Egyptian Moor named Salah Hailak Al Ghala, a merchant seaman from a little village called Beluwla, in Nubia of Ancient Egypt." Another genealogical tree shows Bobby Williams' father as unknown and his mother as "Madam Decontee" of the Bassa tribe of Liberia. These claims have not been documented.

Aliases
York has been known by a multitude of aliases over the years, many of which he used simultaneously. They include the following:

 Dr. York
 Malakai Z. York
 Dr. Malachi Z. York-El
 H.E. Dr. Malachi Kobina Yorke™
 Imperial Grand Potentate Noble: Rev. Dr. Malachi Z. York 33°/720°
 Consul General: Dr. Malachi Z. York ©™
 Grand Al Mufti "Divan" Noble Rev. Dr. Malichi Z. York-El
 As Sayyid Al Imaam Issa Al Haadi Al Mahdi
 Asayeed El Imaam Issa El Haaiy El Mahdi
 Isa Abd'Allah Ibn Abu Bakr Muhammad
 Isa al Haadi al-Mahdi
 Al Hajj Al Imaam Isa Abd'Allah Muhammad Al Mahdi
Irie I Sayyid Al Mumbra Issa El Haajidi Tundi the Divine and Noble Blackthello

See also
 Black supremacy

References

External links
 Bureau of Prisons inmate registry: Dwight York 
 Adam Heimlich, "Black Egypt: A Visit to Tama-Re", New York Press, November 14, 2000
 Robert Stacy McCain, "Nuwaubian Nightmare", Washington Times, June 2, 2002
 "Sect chief's influence felt at Clarke jail: Deputy's letter to convicted child molester sparks probe by chief jailer who's fired", OnlineAthens.com June 18, 2006
 Books authored by Malachi York
 "Facts About Dr. York Legal Case And His Innocence", Nuwaubian Facts website

Further reading

 Kossy, Donna. "Ansaaru Allah Community," in Kooks: A Guide to the Outer Limits of Human Belief, Feral House, 1994
 Osinski, Bill. Ungodly: A True Story of Unprecedented Evil, Indigo Custom Publishing, 2007
 Palmer, Susan J. "The Ansaaru Allah Community: United Nuwaubian Nation of Moors," in The Encyclopedia of Cults, Sects and New Religions, ed. by Lewis, James R., Prometheus Books, 2001
 Rohan, Robert J. Holding York Responsible, Robert J. Rohan, 2005
Atlanta Journal-Constitution, September 20, 1998, p. C1; January 24, 2004, p. D1.
Fulton County Daily Report, July 27, 2007.
Macon Telegraph (Macon, GA) - articles on York dated June 10, 2005; May 20, 2007.
New York Press, November 8, 2000.
Orange County Register (Santa Ana, CA), April 22, 2004.
Time, July 12, 1999, p. 32.
Washington Times, June 2, 2002, p. A5.

1935 births
Living people
20th-century African-American people
21st-century African-American people
20th-century criminals
21st-century criminals
African-American musicians
African-American writers
American members of the clergy convicted of crimes
American people convicted of child sexual abuse
American people convicted of rape
American people who self-identify as being of Native American descent
American prisoners sentenced to life imprisonment
Black supremacists
Clergy from Boston
Cult leaders
Founders of new religious movements
Inmates of ADX Florence
Nuwaubianism
Pedophilia in the United States
People convicted of racketeering
People with delusional disorder
People with histrionic personality disorder
People with schizotypal personality disorder
Religious leaders from Massachusetts
Religious leaders from New York City
Religious figures convicted of child sexual abuse
Writers from Boston